The 1922 Clemson Tigers football team represented Clemson Agricultural College—now known as Clemson University—as a member of the Southern Conference (SoCon) during the 1922 college football season. Led by E. J. Stewart in his second and final season as head coach, the Tigers compiled an overall record 5–4 with a mark of 1–2 in conference play, tying for 11th place in the SoCon.  E. H. Emanuel was the team captain. Clemson's 100th program win came October 13 against Presbyterian.

Schedule

References

Clemson
Clemson Tigers football seasons
Clemson Tigers football